Since 1980, British pop musical group Level 42 has released 11 studio albums. The band's latest was Retroglide, released in 2006. The group has one Top 10 hit on the American Billboard Hot 100 chart ("Something About You") and six top 10s on the British UK single charts ("The Sun Goes Down (Living It Up)", "Something About You", "Lessons In Love", "Running in the Family", "To Be With You Again" and "It's Over"). In Canada, it achieved two platinum albums and two gold singles ("Something About You" and "Lessons in Love"). Level 42 has sold 31 million units worldwide.

Albums

Studio albums

Live albums

Compilation albums

Box sets

EPs

Singles

Videography

Video albums

Music videos

Notes

References

External links
 the most comprehensive online Level 42 discography
 Level 42 official website
 forevernow.com

Discographies of British artists
Rock music group discographies
New wave discographies